Helen Montilla (born 4 December 1969) is a Spanish sailor. She competed in the Europe event at the 1996 Summer Olympics.

References

External links
 

1969 births
Living people
Spanish female sailors (sport)
Olympic sailors of Spain
Sailors at the 1996 Summer Olympics – Europe
Sportspeople from Barcelona